is a city located in Ehime Prefecture, Japan. , the city had an estimated population of 35,456 in 17627 households and a population density of 69 persons per km².

Geography
Seiyo is located in southeastern Ehime Prefecture, with Uwa Bay on the Seto Inland Sea to the west, and with the Shikoku Mountainsto the east, with a difference in elevation of 1403 meters. The city area is long from east to west and due to its diverse topography, it was certified as a Japanese Geopark (Shikoku Seiyo Geopark) by the Japan Geoparks Committee on September 24, 2013. Onogahara, which is part of the Shikoku Karst, one of Japan's three major karst landscape, is very beautiful with its green grassland and white limestone. Komatsu is home to Rakan Cave, one of the largest caves in Shikoku, which is open to the public as a show cave with a length of 700 meters.

Neighbouring municipalities 
Ehime Prefecture
Ōzu
Yawatahama
 Ikata
Uwajima
 Kumakōgen
 Uchiko
 Kihoku
Kōchi Prefecture
 Yusuhara

Climate
Seiyo has a diverse climate, from the inland mountain plateau (Onogahara), where more than 2 meters of snow accumulates in winter, to the warm coastal area, and the basin with a lot of fog due to the influence of two dams. During the typhoon season, coastal areas are often damaged by high tides and high waves, and mountainous areas are often damaged by landslides caused by heavy rain. The temperature can differ by more than 10 degrees between the coastal area and Onogahara. In general, Seiyo has a Humid subtropical climate (Köppen Cfa) characterized by warm summers and cool winters with light snowfall.  The average annual temperature in Seiyo is 15.3 °C. The average annual rainfall is 1663 mm with September as the wettest month. The temperatures are highest on average in January, at around 26.1 °C, and lowest in January, at around 4.7 °C.

Demographics
Per Japanese census data, the population of Seiyo has been decreased steadily since the 1960s.

History 
The area of Seiyo was part of ancient Iyo Province. During the Edo period, the areaway part of the holdings of Uwajima Domain or its subsidiary Iyo-Yoshida Domain. Following the Meiji restoration, the area was organized into towns and villages within Higashiuwa District and Nishiuwa District in Ehime Prefecture. The city of Seiyo was established on April 1, 2004, from the merger of the towns of Akehama, Nomura, Shirokawa and Uwa (all from Higashiuwa District), and the town of Mikame (from Nishiuwa District).

Government
Seiyo has a mayor-council form of government with a directly elected mayor and a unicameral city council of 18 members. Seiyo contributes one member to the Ehime Prefectural Assembly. In terms of national politics, the city is part of Ehime 4th district  of the lower house of the Diet of Japan.

Economy
The industrial base of Seiyo is weak and the economy is poor. In the past, the Uwa neighborhood  (Unomachi) and the Nomura neighborhood were distribution points for rural goods, but due to poor transportation connection and rural depopulation, commerce has declined. The main economic activity is agriculture, with citrus fruits, rice and chestnuts are mainly cultivated. Animal husbandry (pigs, dairy cows, beef cattle) is also practiced.

Education
Seiyo has 12 public elementary schools and five public middle schools operated by the city government. The city has three public high schools operated by the Ehime Prefectural Board of Education, and the prefecture also operates two special education schools for the handicapped.

Transportation

Railways 
 Shikoku Railway Company - Yosan Line
  -  -  -

Highways 
  Matsuyama Expressway

Local attractions

Kannon Spring Water
This water was designated as one of Japan's  by the Ministry of the Environment in March 1985. Hiking trails along the spring's mountain rivers are a popular destination in the summertime.

Otoi Sumo
The former town of Nomura, now a part of Seiyo, holds an annual sumo competition for children and amateur adults known as the  Tournament. It is held after the Kyushu basho and usually attracts a few professional sumo wrestlers.

Castle Land
A wealthy eccentric built a castle on the side of a mountain near the Nomura Dam in the former town of Nomura. It was originally a retreat for parties, complete with overnight lodging facilities. It never achieved any measure of popularity, and the owner eventually donated it to the city of Seiyo. It now lies uninhabited and largely unused.

Museums 
 Museum of Ehime History and Culture
 Kaimei School

Shrine and temples
Meiseki-ji, 43rd temple on the Shikoku Pilgrimage

References

External links
  

 
Cities in Ehime Prefecture
Populated coastal places in Japan